Shirin Kand (also Romanized as Shīrīn Kand) is a village in Leylan-e Jonubi Rural District of Leylan District, Malekan County, East Azerbaijan province, Iran. At the 2006 National Census, its population was 2,379 in 581 households. The following census in 2011 counted 2,627 people in 727 households. The latest census in 2016 showed a population of 2,744 people in 815 households; it was the largest village in its rural district.

References 

Malekan County

Populated places in East Azerbaijan Province

Populated places in Malekan County